"Song to Say Goodbye" is a song by English alternative rock band Placebo from their fifth studio album, Meds (2006). It was released on 6 March 2006 as the album's second single. It  was written by Steve Hewitt, Brian Molko and Stefan Olsdal, and produced by Dimitri Tikovoi. The first single, "Because I Want You" was only released in the United Kingdom, so elsewhere, "Song to Say Goodbye" is considered the first single from Meds. The song develops around piano notes that repeat throughout it. The song deals with heroin addiction and its influence on the relationships of the parties involved.

There is a live version available of the song on the live EP Live at La Cigale.

The cover art features a blurred picture of vocalist Brian Molko.

Music video
The original video written and directed by Philippe André portrays a mentally challenged father while his son is trying to cope with his dad's condition. André made an 8-minute extended version of the music video. Placebo remixed the track for the film released on DVD by EMI. It was filmed in Los Angeles.

Track listing

7"
Side A - "Song to Say Goodbye" (Radio edit)
Side B - "Because I Want You" (Ladytron remix)

Slimline Wallet CD
"Song to Say Goodbye" (Radio edit)
"Because I Want You" (Russell Lissack Bloc Party remix)

Maxi CD
"Song to Say Goodbye" (album version)
"36 Degrees" (Live from Wembley)
"Because I Want You" (Russell Lissack Bloc Party remix)
"Because I Want You" (Ladytron Club mix)

Charts

Weekly charts

Cover versions and remixes

Harakiri for the Sky version (2021)
"Song to Say Goodbye" was covered and released as a single by Austrian post-black metal band Harakiri for the Sky in January 2021. The song closes Harakiri for the Sky's album "Mӕre" just as it closes Placebo's album Meds.

References

External links
 

Placebo (band) songs
2006 singles
Songs written by Steve Hewitt
Songs written by Brian Molko
Songs written by Stefan Olsdal
Rock ballads
2006 songs
Song recordings produced by Dimitri Tikovoï
Songs about heroin